Rheidol can refer to:
Afon Rheidol, a river in Mid-Wales
Vale of Rheidol Railway, a narrow-gauge railway in Mid-Wales
Rheidol power station, a hydroelectric scheme on the Afon Rheidol
Rheidol (locomotive), a former locomotive on the Vale of Rheidol Railway
Rheidol Falls railway station, a station on the Vale of Rheidol Railway